Eric Mania Kibi (born 4 August 1990) is a Congolese-Canadian basketball player for Colegio Los Leones de Quilpué. He has been a member of the DR Congo men's national basketball team.

Early life
Kibi was born in Quebec City, Canada to Congolese parents.

Professional career
In January 2019, Kibi signed in Iraq with Al-Mina'a.
On 20 March 2020, Kibi signed with the Ottawa Blackjacks for a second CEBL season.

On 11 September 2020, Kibi signed with The Hague Royals of the Dutch Basketball League (DBL).

On 28 May 2021, Kibi returned to the Ottawa Blackjacks.

National team career
Internationally, Kibi represents the DR Congo national basketball team. He helped his country win the gold medal at FIBA AfroCan 2019. Kibi was also on the roster for AfroBasket 2021, coming off the bench for 2.7 points per game.

Honours

Club
Saskatchewan Rattlers
Canadian Elite Basketball League: 2019

National team
DR Congo
AfroCan: 2019  Gold medal

References

External links
Eurobasket profile

1990 births
Living people
Abilene Christian Wildcats men's basketball players
Al-Mina'a basketball players
Canadian men's basketball players
CB L'Hospitalet players
Democratic Republic of the Congo men's basketball players
GET Vosges players
Junior college men's basketball players in the United States
Little Rock Trojans men's basketball players
London Lightning players
MBK Handlová players
The Hague Royals players
Ottawa Blackjacks players
Ottawa SkyHawks players
Randers Cimbria players
Dutch Basketball League players
Saskatchewan Rattlers players
Small forwards
21st-century Democratic Republic of the Congo people